Khoja is a surname. Notable people with the surname include:

 Abdulaziz bin Mohieddin Khoja (born 1940), Saudi Arabian diplomat
 Afaq Khoja (date of birth unknown–1693/94), religious and political leader in Kashgaria (modern-day southern Xinjiang)
 Ilyas Khoja (died 1368), Khan in Transoxiana and Khan of Moghulistan
 Jahangir Khoja, a member of the influential East Turkestan Āfāqī khoja clan
 Khaled Khoja (born 1965), Syrian Turkish politician
 Muhammad Yusuf Khoja, 7th-century Naqshbandi Sufi figure
 Khizr Khoja, son of the Chagatai khan Tughlugh Timur

Fictional characters
 Warpriest Kh'oja, a fanatical and deceitful Skrull leader in Marvel Comics

Surnames of Arabic origin
Surnames of Turkish origin